Gulmohar is a common name for the flowering plant Delonix regia.

Gulmohar may also refer to:

 Gulmohar (2009 film), a Marathi film
 Gulmohar (2023 film), an upcoming Indian Hindi-language drama film